Ashley Ann Whitney (born August 21, 1979) is an American former competition swimmer who was a freestyle specialist and an Olympic gold medalist.

At the 1996 Summer Olympics in Atlanta, Georgia, Whitney earned a gold medal when she swam for the winning U.S. team in the preliminary heats of the women's 4×200-meter freestyle relay.

She was born in Nashville, Tennessee.  For high school, she attended the Bolles School, a private prep school in Jacksonville, Florida, where she swam for coach Gregg Troy's Bolles high school swim team, a program with a reputation for producing future international swimmers and Olympians.  She graduated from the Bolles School in 1998.

Whitney initially attended the University of Georgia, where she was a member of coach Jack Bauerle's Georgia Bulldogs swimming and diving team in 1999—Georgia's first NCAA national championship team.  She later transferred to the University of California, Berkeley, where she finished her college career swimming for coach Teri McKeever's Cal Bears women's swimming and diving team.

See also

 List of Olympic medalists in swimming (women)
 List of University of California, Berkeley alumni
 List of University of Georgia people

References

External links
 

1979 births
Living people
American female freestyle swimmers
California Golden Bears women's swimmers
Florida Gators women's swimmers
Georgia Bulldogs women's swimmers
Olympic gold medalists for the United States in swimming
Sportspeople from Nashville, Tennessee
Swimmers at the 1996 Summer Olympics
Medalists at the 1996 Summer Olympics
Bolles School alumni